Bipan Chandra (24 May 1928 – 30 August 2014) was an Indian historian, specialising in economic and political history of modern India. An emeritus professor of modern history at Jawaharlal Nehru University, he specialized on the Indian independence movement and is considered a leading scholar on Mahatma Gandhi. He authored several books, including The Rise and Growth of Economic Nationalism.

Early life and education
Chandra was born in Kangra in Punjab, British India (now in Himachal Pradesh). As used to be the case in old Punjab, his early education was in Urdu, he was best at home in his early years with an Urdu novel by his side. He graduated from Forman Christian College, Lahore in 1946 after which the Partition forced him to leave. Thereafter he went to the United States where he studied at the Stanford University, California, United States, to complete his graduation and post-graduation. He established contact with Communists there, and, caught in the net cast under Senator McCarthy’s anti-Communist crusade, he was deported to India. Back in Delhi in the early 1950s, Bipan Chandra was appointed lecturer in history at the Hindu College, Delhi. Later he completed his Ph.D. from Delhi University in 1963.

Career
Chandra taught for many years as lecturer and then as reader at Hindu College, Delhi. He became professor of History at Jawaharlal Nehru University, New Delhi, soon after the university was founded and after retirement was appointed as an emeritus professor there. He founded the journal Enquiry and was a member of its editorial board for a long time.

Chandra was a sectional president and then the general president of the Indian History Congress in 1985. He was chairperson of the Centre for Historical Studies, Jawaharlal Nehru University, New Delhi. He became a member of the University Grants Commission in 1993. He was the chairman of the National Book Trust, New Delhi from 2004 to 2012. As Chairman of National Book Trust, India, he started many new series such as Popular Social Science, Autobiography, Afro-Asian Countries series, Indian Diaspora Studies etc.

In his retirement years he was appointed as a national research professor in 2007.

Research
Chandra was at the forefront of the communist movement in India since independence. His co-authored book,  Freedom Struggle, was censored by the new central government that came to power in India in 1977. He collaborated with historians such Nurul Hasan, Ram Sharan Sharma, Sarvapalli Gopal, Satish Chandra, Romila Thapar, Irfan Habib, Barun De and Arjun Dev and some of his students, such as Mridula Mukherjee, Aditya Mukherjee, Sucheta Mahajan and Vishalakshi Menon, some of whose textbooks have previously been prescribed in the history syllabi of schools in India.

Controversy
In April 2016, right-wing activist Dinanath Batra sought a ban on Chandra's bestselling India's Struggle for Independence because of a misunderstanding of the terminology used in it.

Death
Chandra died on  30 August 2014, at his home in Gurgaon, after prolonged illness, aged 86. JNU organised a commemorative event on his birth anniversary.

Publications
The Making of Modern India: From Marx to Gandhi, Orient Blackswan, 2000
History of Modern India, Orient Blackswan, 1990
Communalism: A Primer, (New Delhi, 2008)
In the Name of Democracy: The JP Movement and the Emergency, (New Delhi, 2003)
Essays on Colonialism, (New Delhi, 1999)
India Since Independence, (jointly with Mridula Mukherjee and Aditya Mukherjee), (New Delhi, 1999)
Ideology and Politics in Modern India, (New Delhi, 1994)
Essays on Indian Nationalism, (New Delhi, 1993)
Essays on Contemporary India, (New Delhi, 1993)
The Epic Struggle, (New Delhi, 1992)
India's Struggle for Independence, 1857-1947, (New Delhi, 1989)
Indian National Movement: The Long Term Dynamics, (New Delhi, 1988)
Communalism in Modern India, (New Delhi, 1984)
The Indian Left: Critical Appraisal, (New Delhi, 1983)
Nationalism and Colonialism in Modern India, (New Delhi, 1979)
Freedom Struggle, (jointly with Amalesh Tripathi and Barun De), (New Delhi, 1972))
The Rise and Growth of Economic Nationalism in India: Economic Policies of Indian National Leadership, 1880-1905 (New Delhi, 1966)

References

1928 births
2014 deaths
Emeritus Professors in India
Historians of South Asia
Historians of India
Writers about Hindu nationalism
Stanford University alumni
Delhi University alumni
Academic staff of Delhi University
Academic staff of Jawaharlal Nehru University
Forman Christian College alumni
Recipients of the Padma Bhushan in literature & education
Indian Marxist historians
Indian political writers
Writers from Himachal Pradesh
20th-century Indian historians
People from Kangra, Himachal Pradesh
Scholars from Himachal Pradesh